= Begrih Formation =

Geologic formation in Malaysia

The Begrih Formation is a geologic formation in Sarawak, Malaysia. It preserves plant fossils dating to the Early Pliocene.
